Shark is a 2015 British television series created by the BBC Natural History Unit in co-operation with Discovery Channel UK.

Episodes

References

External links
 
 Shark at BBC Earth
 

BBC high definition shows
2015 British television series debuts
2015 British television series endings
BBC television documentaries
Discovery Channel original programming